Henri Kontinen and John Peers were the defending champions, but lost in the first round to Juan Sebastián Cabal and Robert Farah.

Jamie Murray and Bruno Soares won the title, defeating Mike Bryan and Édouard Roger-Vasselin in the final, 3–6, 6–3, [10–4].

Seeds

Draw

Draw

Qualifying

Seeds

Qualifiers
  Divij Sharan /  Artem Sitak

Qualifying draw

References

Sources
 Main Draw
 Qualifying Draw

Citi Open - Men's Doubles